Khalid Sebil Ibrahim Ahmed Lashkari (born 22 June 1987 in Abu Dhabi, United Arab Emirates) is Emirati footballer, who plays . He was called to United Arab Emirates national football team at 2011 AFC Asian Cup as a defender .

References

External links 
 
 

1987 births
Living people
2011 AFC Asian Cup players
Al-Wasl F.C. players
Al Jazira Club players
Al-Nasr SC (Dubai) players
Emirati footballers
United Arab Emirates international footballers
UAE Pro League players
Association football defenders